Scouting in Austria is served by multiple Scout associations, among them
Pfadfinder und Pfadfinderinnen Österreichs, member of World Organization of the Scout Movement and WAGGGS, member of the Austrian National Youth Council
Österreichischer Pfadfinderbund, 3000 members, founded 1914/reorganized 1949, member of the Austrian National Youth Council 
Pfadfinder-Gilde Österreichs, founder member of the International Scout and Guide Fellowship, founded in 1951, 3000 members 
Katholische Pfadfinderschaft Europas-Österreich (Catholic Scouts of Europe), affiliated to Union Internationale des Guides et Scouts d'Europe, founded in 1981 
Royal Rangers Austria, affiliated to Royal Rangers International, founded 1985
Adventwacht, affiliated to Pathfinders International
Hashomer Hatzair, member of the Austrian National Youth Council 
Muslimische Pfadfinderinnen und Pfadfinder Österreich (Islamic), founded in 2004 
Pfadfinder der Kirche Jesu Christi der Heiligen der Letzten Tage, is an organization of the Church of Jesus Christ of Latter-day Saints, founded in 1974
Europa Scouts, founded 1949 
Pfadfinderinnen und Pfadfinder Europas-Österreich, founded 2000 
Scouts of Europa - Europäische Pfadfinderbewegung, Prospect Member of the World Federation of Independent Scouts, founded 2006

International Scout and Guide units in Austria
Boy Scouts of America, served by the Transatlantic Council
Girlguiding UK, served by British Guides in Foreign Countries
Girl Scouts of the USA, served by USAGSO headquarters
Scouts et Guides de France operates one group in Vienna.
Hungarian Scouting, served by Külföldi Magyar Cserkészszövetség - Hungarian Scout Association in Exteris
Homenetmen has one chapter in Vienna, founded in 1985

See also
Rudolf Carl von Slatin, early promoter and supporter of Scouting in Austria and Honorary Chief Scout
Scouting in displaced persons camps

References